Macrosoma tipulata is a moth-like butterfly in the family Hedylidae. It was described by Jacob Hübner in 1818.

References

Hedylidae
Butterflies described in 1818